Ilija Tučević (born 18 October 1995) is a Montenegrin football player who plays for Sutjeska Nikšić.

Club career
Tučević started his career at hometown club Grbalj and joined Budućnost Podgorica in summer 2017.
On 13 August 2019 he signed with Russian club FC Armavir.

He made his Russian Football National League debut for FC Armavir on 7 September 2019 in a game against FC Nizhny Novgorod, he substituted Denis Kutin in the 64th minute.

References

External links
 

1995 births
Living people
People from Kotor Municipality
Association football defenders
Montenegrin footballers
Montenegro youth international footballers
Montenegro under-21 international footballers
OFK Grbalj players
FK Budućnost Podgorica players
FC Armavir players
Montenegrin First League players
Russian First League players
Montenegrin expatriate footballers
Expatriate footballers in Russia
Montenegrin expatriate sportspeople in Russia